Ulang may refer to:

Ulang County, in Sudan
Owlang (disambiguation), places in Iran